is a Japanese suspense mystery television series. It was broadcast on Nippon Television and other NNS stations from July 16 to September 17, 2014, with a total of 10 episodes. A spinoff film, Eiga ST Aka to Shirō no Sōsa File, was released on January 10, 2015.

Cast
 Tatsuya Fujiwara as Samon Akagi
 Masaki Okada as Tomohisa Yurine
 Mirai Shida as Shō Aoyama
 Sei Ashina as Midori Yūki
 Masataka Kubota as Yūji Kurosaki
 Hiroki Miyake as Saizō Yamabuki
 Yuki Shibamoto as Momoko Tsutsui
 Kensei Mikami as Shinji Makimura
 Tetsushi Tanaka as Gorō Kikukawa
 Kento Hayashi as Sōsuke Ikeda
 Asaka Seto as Shiori Matsudo
 Atsuro Watabe as Toshirō Saegusa

References

External links
 

2014 Japanese television series debuts
2014 Japanese television series endings
Mystery television series
Nippon TV dramas
Thriller television series